Deutzia silvestrii is a species of Safflower in the family Hydrangeaceae. It is found in central China.

References

silvestrii